{{Speciesbox
|image =
|genus = Grevillea
|species = eremophila
|authority = (Diels) Olde & Marriott
|synonyms_ref = 
|synonyms =
 Grevillea integrifolia subsp. ceratocarpa 'subsericeous form' 
 Grevillea integrifolia var. eremophila Diels
 Grevillea integrifolia var. grandiflora S.Moore 
}}Grevillea eremophila is a species of flowering plant in the family Proteaceae and is endemic to the south-west of Western Australia. It is an erect shrub with leathery, linear to narrowly egg-shaped leaves with the narrower end towards the base, and creamy-white flowers.

TaxonomyGrevillea eremophila was first formally described in 1904 by Ludwig Diels, who gave it the name Grevillea integrifolia var. eremophila in Botanische Jahrbücher für Systematik, Pflanzengeschichte und Pflanzengeographie. In 1994, Peter M. Olde and Neil R. Marriott raised the variety to species status as Grevillea eremophila in The Grevillea Book. The specific epithet (eremophila'') means "solitary-loving".

Distribution and habitat
This grevillea grows on sandplains and heathlands, mainly between Comet Vale, Beacon and Narembeen in the Avon Wheatbelt, Coolgardie, Mallee, Murchison and Yalgoo biogeographic regions of south-western Western Australia.

See also
 List of Grevillea species

References

eremophila
Proteales of Australia
Eudicots of Western Australia
Taxa named by Ludwig Diels
Plants described in 1904